Bruce v. Samuels, 577 U.S. ___ (2016), was a United States Supreme Court case in which the Court held that the Prison Litigation Reform Act of 1995 requires prisoners to pay twenty percent of their prior month's income for each case they file. The Court rejected the petitioner's argument that prisoners were only required to pay a maximum of twenty percent of their monthly income, even if they file multiple cases.

Opinion of the Court 
Associate Justice Ruth Bader Ginsburg authored a unanimous decision.

References

External links
 
 SCOTUSblog coverage

United States Supreme Court cases
United States Supreme Court cases of the Roberts Court
2016 in United States case law
Penal system in the United States